Mogravadi is a census town in Valsad district in the Indian state of Gujarat.

Demographics
 India census, Mogravadi had a population of 17,520. Males constitute 53% of the population and females 47%. Mogravadi has an average literacy rate of 78%, higher than the national average of 59.5%: male literacy is 83%, and female literacy is 71%. In Mogravadi, 12% of the population is under 6 years of age.

References

Cities and towns in Valsad district